Philip E Norman FSA (9 July 1842 – 17 May 1931) was a British artist, author and antiquary.

Background 
Born in 1842 in Bromley Common, Kent, Norman was the son of George Warde Norman (1793–1882), who was a director of the Bank of England, and writer on banking and currency, and brother of Frederick Norman, the merchant banker. He lived in London, and died on 17 May 1931 in South Kensington at the age of 88.

Cricket
Norman was educated at Eton College, where he was a notable cricketer, and where, at the age of 17, he won the 120 yards hurdle race in the then record time of 18 seconds. He was later to play one season of first-class cricket in 1865 with the Gentlemen of Kent.

Art
Norman was trained as a draughtsman and painter in watercolours at the Slade School, often exhibiting at the Royal Academy. A large part of his work consisted of depicting parts of London that he knew, particularly buildings or areas which stood as a survivor of a bygone past or which were about to be demolished. Norman also recorded the history of the buildings which he painted or photographed, and works such as London Vanished and Vanishing, written in 1905, provide a fascinating record of bygone London. The historian Hermione Hobhouse has described Norman as one-third of the "triumvirate" of key figures whose works record the topography of London between 1890 and 1950, the others being Walter Hindes Godfrey and Percy Wells Lovell.

Exhibitions
Norman exhibited at the Royal Academy Summer Exhibition on at least 26 occasions from 1877 to 1926, and also at other galleries in London.

Institutions
Norman was elected a Fellow of the Society of Antiquaries in 1886, acting as Treasurer from 1897 to 1913 and Vice-President from 1913 to 1917.

Collections
Norman gave many of his works to the London Museum. His photographs are now held by the English Heritage Archive, and his watercolour paintings and drawings of London are kept by the Victoria and Albert Museum.

Publications 
Norman authored, illustrated or contributed to the following:

 London Signs and Inscriptions, London: Elliot Stock (1893)
 "London buildings photographed, 1860–1870", London Topographical Record, vol. 2 (1903), pp. 36–41
 London Vanished and Vanishing, London: Adam & Charles Black (1905)
 Survey of London, London County Council (1909).
 Cromwell House Highgate: its history and associations, London: John Murray (1917)
 The London City Churches, London: The London Society (1929)

References

External links 

Philip Norman Watercolour of Parlington Hall in Yorkshire painted by the artist in 1911, re-united at Lotherton Hall, the last Gascoigne family home.

1842 births
1931 deaths
People from Chelsea, London
Fellows of the Society of Antiquaries of London
People educated at Eton College
English antiquarians
19th-century antiquarians
20th-century antiquarians
19th-century English painters
English male painters
20th-century English painters
Alumni of the Slade School of Fine Art
English cricketers
Gentlemen of Kent cricketers
20th-century English male artists
19th-century English male artists